Jonathan Guzmán Pena (born July 17, 1989), best known as Jonathan Guzmán, is a Dominican professional boxer who held the IBF junior featherweight title in 2016.

Professional career
Guzmán made his professional debut on December 18, 2011, scoring a fourth-round technical knockout over Alejandro Brito. Fighting almost exclusively in his native Dominican Republic for the next three years, Guzmán would score all of his wins by knockout or stoppage, except for a second-round no contest against Luis Hinojosa on May 18, 2013. Having won five fights in the United States, all by knockout, Guzmán travelled to Japan to face Shingo Wake on July 20, 2016. A late eleventh-round stoppage saw Guzmán win the vacant IBF junior featherweight title, but this reign would be short-lived, as Guzmán lost the title by unanimous decision to Yukinori Oguni on December 31, in his first career defeat.

Professional boxing record

References

External links

Jonathan Guzmán profile at Premier Boxing Champions

1989 births
Living people
Dominican Republic male boxers
People from Santo Domingo Province
Bantamweight boxers
Super-bantamweight boxers
International Boxing Federation champions
World super-bantamweight boxing champions